Iridictyon is a small genus of damselflies in the family Calopterygidae. It contain only two species, both known only from Guyana and Venezuela:
Iridictyon myersi  - Tepui Shinywing
Iridictyon trebbaui  - White-banded Shinywing

References

Calopterygidae
Zygoptera genera
Taxa named by James George Needham
Fauna of the Tepuis